Cléden-Poher is a commune in the Finistère department of Brittany in north-western France.

Population
Inhabitants of Cléden-Poher are called in French Clédinois.

Map

See also
Communes of the Finistère department

References

External links

Mayors of Finistère Association  

Communes of Finistère